A referendum on federal salaries was held in Switzerland on 28 May 1933. Voters were asked whether they approved of a federal law that would lower the salaries of federal officials on a temporary basis. The proposal was rejected by 55.1% of voters.

Background
The referendum was an optional referendum, which only a majority of the vote, as opposed to the mandatory referendums, which required a double majority; a majority of the popular vote and majority of the cantons.

Results

References

1933 referendums
1933 in Switzerland
Referendums in Switzerland